In phonetics, liquids are a class of consonants consisting of voiced lateral approximants like  together with rhotics like .

Etymology
The grammarian Dionysius Thrax used the Ancient Greek word  to describe the sonorant consonants of classical Greek. Most commentators assume that this referred to their "slippery" effect on meter in classical Greek verse when they occur as the second member of a consonant cluster.

Phonological properties
Liquids as a class often behave in a similar way in the phonotactics of a language: for example, they often have the greatest freedom in occurring in consonant clusters.

Metathesis
Cross-linguistically, liquids are the consonants most prone to metathesis.

Spanish
In Spanish, /r/ is liable for metathesis. More specifically, /r/ and /l/ frequently switch places:
 Lat. crocodīlus > Span. cocodrilo “crocodile”
 Lat. mīrāculum > Span. milagro “miracle”
 Lat. perīculum > Span. peligro “danger”
 Lat. parabola > Span. palabra “speech”

English
comfortable is frequently pronounced /ˈkʌmf.tɚ.bəl/ in rhotic varieties, although its stem, comfort is pronounced /ˈkʌm.fɚt/, with the rhotic /ɹ/ in its original position.

Dissimilation
Liquids are also prone to dissimilation when they occur in sequence.

Sequence r..r > l..r
 Latin peregrinus > Old French pelegrin (> )

Sequence l..l > r..l
 Italian colonello > Middle French coronnel
It was formerly spelt coronel and is a borrowing from Middle French coronnel, which arose as a result of dissimilation from Italian colonnello.

Nucleus slot
Liquids are also the consonants most prone to occupying the nucleus slot in a syllable (the slot usually assigned to vowels).

Areal distribution
Languages differ in the number and nature of their liquid consonants.

Many languages, such as Japanese, Korean, or Polynesian languages (see below), have a single liquid phoneme that has both lateral and rhotic allophones.

English has two liquid phonemes, one lateral,  and one rhotic, exemplified in the words led and red.

Many other European languages have one lateral and one rhotic phoneme. Some, such as Greek, Italian and Serbo-Croatian, have more than two liquid phonemes. All three languages have the set , with two laterals and one rhotic. Similarly, the Iberian languages contrast four liquid phonemes. Some European languages, for example Russian and Irish, contrast a palatalized lateral–rhotic pair with an unpalatalized (or velarized) set (e.g.  in Russian).

Elsewhere in the world, two liquids of the types mentioned above remains the most common attribute of a language's consonant inventory except in North America and Australia. In North America, a majority of languages do not have rhotics at all and there is a wide variety of lateral sounds though most are obstruent laterals rather than liquids. Most indigenous Australian languages are very rich in liquids, with some having as many as seven distinct liquids. They typically include dental, alveolar, retroflex and palatal laterals, and as many as three rhotics.

On the other side, there are many indigenous languages in the Amazon Basin and eastern North America, as well as a few in Asia and Africa, with no liquids.

Polynesian languages typically have only one liquid, which may be either a lateral or a rhotic. Araki has ,) or less (e.g. Mwotlap has only ). Hiw is unusual in having a prestopped velar lateral  as its only liquid.

See also
 Sonorant
 List of phonetics topics
 Perception of English /r/ and /l/ by Japanese speakers
 Engrish

References

 
Phonetics
Phonology